The 2022–23 Ole Miss Rebels women's basketball team represents the University of Mississippi during the 2022–23 NCAA Division I women's basketball season. The Rebels, led by fifth-year head coach Yolett McPhee-McCuin, play their home games at The Sandy and John Black Pavilion at Ole Miss and compete as members of the Southeastern Conference (SEC).

Previous season
The Rebels finished the season 23–9 (10–6 SEC) and received an at-large bid to the NCAA tournament, where they lost to South Dakota in the First Round.

Offseason

Departures

2022 recruiting class

Incoming transfers

Roster

Schedule

|-
!colspan=9 style=| Exhibition

|-
!colspan=9 style=| Non-conference regular season

|-
!colspan=9 style=| SEC regular season

|-
!colspan=9 style=| SEC Tournament

|-
!colspan=9 style=| NCAA Tournament

Rankings

See also
2022–23 Ole Miss Rebels men's basketball team

References

Ole Miss Rebels women's basketball seasons
Ole Miss
Ole Miss Rebels
Ole Miss Rebels
Ole Miss